Werner Kreipe (12 April 1904 – 7 September 1967) was a German World War II Luftwaffe General der Flieger.

Luftwaffe career
Kreipe joined the Luftwaffe in 1934. Kreipe held various staff positions until the winter 1939/40, when he was selected or applied for a field role. He joined Kampfgeschwader 2 (Bomber Wing 2) and commanded its III. Gruppe during the Battle of France and the Battle of Belgium. In June 1940 he returned to various staff positions. In December 1941 he was promoted as Chief of Staff, 1st Air Corps (I. Fliegerkorps). In July 1943 he was appointed General der Flieger (General of Fliers). In August 1944 he was promoted to Acting Chief of the Luftwaffe's General Staff after the death of Günther Korten in the 20 July plot.

Dissatisfied with Hermann Göring's leadership of the Luftwaffe, Adolf Hitler wanted to replace him with Robert Ritter von Greim. Unable to convince Greim to accept the role, Hitler forced Göring to sack Kreipe, and provisionally replace him on 19 September 1944 with the stolid Karl Koller, who was officially assigned the position on 12 November. However, Koller was unable to reform the Luftwaffe, which had been mismanaged by Göring and had lost air superiority over the skies of Europe.

In January 1945, he organised the logistical effort and preparation for the Luftwaffe's last major offensive, Unternehmen Bodenplatte (Operation Baseplate) on 1 January 1945. Kreipe continued in staff positions until surrendering to the Western Allies in May 1945.

Post war
In 1956 Kreipe wrote a book about the war, and the Luftwaffe's role titled, The Fatal Decision: Six Decisive Battles of the Second World War from the Viewpoint of the Vanquished.

Awards
 Blood Order 9 November 1923
 Iron Cross 2nd and 1st Class
 German Cross in Gold on 22 June 1942 as Oberst in the general staff of the 1. Flieger-Korps

References
Citations

Bibliography

External links
 
 Werner Kreipe 
 Werner Kreipe (German)

1904 births
1967 deaths
Condor Legion personnel
Luftwaffe World War II generals
Recipients of the Gold German Cross
German prisoners of war in World War II held by the United Kingdom
Military personnel from Hanover
People from the Province of Hanover
Generals of Aviators
Lufthansa people